The Fiji Women's Pro 2016 was an event of the Association of Surfing Professionals for 2016 ASP World Tour.

This event was held from 29 May to 3 June at Namotu, (Tavarua, Fiji) and opposed by 18 surfers.

The tournament was won by Johanne Defay (FRA), who beat Carissa Moore (HAW) in final.

Round 1

Round 2

Round 3

Round 4

Quarter finals

Semi finals

Final

References

2016 World Surf League
Fiji Pro
2016 in Fijian sport
Surfing in Fiji
Women's surfing